Forrest Aguirre (born July 29, 1969) is an American fantasy and horror author, and winner of the 2003 World Fantasy Award for his editing work on Leviathan 3, for which he was also a Philip K. Dick Award nominee. He recently edited the anthology  Text:UR – The New Book of Masks. His own fiction has been published in a number of genre periodicals and in the collection Fugue XXIX, and his first novel Swans Over the Moon is coming soon from Wheatland Press.  He often writes about Africa, and is deeply interested in the continent.

References

External links 
 Forrest Aguirre bio from Raw Dog Screaming Press

Living people
American short story writers
1969 births
American male novelists
American male short story writers